1996 Emmy Awards may refer to:

 48th Primetime Emmy Awards, the 1996 Emmy Awards ceremony honoring primetime programming during June 1995 – May 1996
 23rd Daytime Emmy Awards, the 1996 Emmy Awards ceremony honoring daytime programming during 1995
 24th International Emmy Awards, honoring international programming

Emmy Award ceremonies by year